Étienne Charlet (8 April 1756 – 27 November 1795) became a division commander during the French Revolutionary Wars and was fatally wounded in action in Italy. He enlisted in the French Royal Army as a dragoon in 1773 and soon transferred to an infantry regiment. In 1782 during the Great Siege of Gibraltar he distinguished himself by saving a shipload of wounded French soldiers from drowning. He retired from military service three years later but joined the Paris National Guard in 1789. He became a captain in 1792 and during the War of the Pyrenees he was rapidly promoted to general of division by the end of 1793, fighting at Bascara in June 1795. Transferred to the Italian theater, he was shot down while leading his division at Loano and died five days later.

References

French generals
French military personnel of the French Revolutionary Wars
French Republican military leaders of the French Revolutionary Wars
French Republican military leaders killed in the French Revolutionary Wars
Republican military leaders of the War in the Vendée
Military personnel from Dijon
1756 births
1795 deaths